The La Jolla Handicap is a Grade III American Thoroughbred horse race for three-year-olds over a distance of one and one-sixteenth miles on the turf scheduled annually in August at Del Mar Racetrack in Del Mar, California. The event currently carries a purse of $150,000.

History
The event is named for the city of La Jolla, California, which is not far from Del Mar.

The event was inaugurated on July 11, 1937, as an event for three-year-olds and older and was won by the five-year-old mare Topsy Omar by the shortest of margins defeating the favorite Grey Count in a time of 1:45. The event was not run in 1939 but moved to early February 1940 to Santa Anita as a seven furlong event for four-year-olds and older on the turf. The champion Seabiscuit resumed in this event after a long layoff carrying 128 pounds after injury and was placed third to Heelfly. Later in the year the event was run at Del Mar at the set distance of one mile.

The event was idle during 1942–1944 due to World War II, resuming in 1945 as a three-year-olds and older California bred handicap.

In 1950 the event's conditions were set for three-year-olds at the distance.

In 1973 the event was classified as Grade III and in 1975 was moved to the turf track and has been run since then on that surface. In 1987 the event's distance was extended from one mile to  miles.  From 2004 to 2013 the event was run as a Grade II.

The event's position in the racing calendar at Del Mar has led to the race being a preparatory race for the Del Mar Derby which is scheduled usually several weeks later.

The event has been split into division four times, the last being in 1982.

Two fillies or mares have won this event. The inaugural running in 1937 and Henpecker in 1948 when the event was restricted to three-year-old fillies.

Records
Speed record: 
 miles: 1:39.52 – Sidney's Candy (2010)
1 mile (dirt):	1:34.20 – Groshawk (1973)
1 mile (turf): 1:34.60 – Floating Reserve (1985)

Margins:
 lengths – Sidney's Candy (2010)

Most wins by a jockey:
 7 – Chris McCarron (1980, 1981, 1982, 1984, 1987, 1989, 1993)

Most wins by a trainer:
 4 – Farrell Jones (1962, 1971, 1974, 1975)

Most wins by an owner:
 3 – Howard B. Keck (1958, 1961, 1977) 
 3 – Glen Hill Farm (1979, 2012, 2014)

La Jolla Handicap – Del Mar Derby double:

Winners

Legend:

 
 

Notes:

§ Ran as an entry

ƒ Filly or Mare

₫ In the 2021 running of the event Sword Zorro (IRE) finished first by a nose in a photo finish but bumped the second-placed finisher Zoffarelli (IRE) from his inside when drifting out under left-handed urging by his jockey Umberto Rispoli and was disqualified. Zoffarelli (IRE) was declared the winner.

† In the 2007 running of the event Medici Code was first past the post and wagering was paid out as the winner, however the horse returned a positive swab for an excess amount of Clenbuterol and consequently was disqualified from the prizemoney and was placed eighth (last). Worldly was declared the official winner of the event.

‡ In 1948 the event was for three-year-old fillies

♯ In August 1940 and 1947 the event was for three-year-olds that were bred in California

¶ In 1941, 1945 and 1946 the event was for three-year-olds and older that were bred in California

°In February 1940 for four-year-olds and older

See also
 List of American and Canadian Graded races

External links
 2022 Del Mar Media Guide

References

Graded stakes races in the United States
Flat horse races for three-year-olds
Horse races in California
Turf races in the United States
Del Mar Racetrack
Recurring sporting events established in 1937
1937 establishments in California
Grade 3 stakes races in the United States